During the 2000–01 English football season, Derby County competed in the FA Premier League (known as the FA Carling Premiership for sponsorship reasons).

Season summary
Derby's season started with one defeat and four draws in their first five games during which they scored 11 goals. However, the goals soon dried up and overall, another season of struggle plagued Pride Park, but Jim Smith's men were saved with one week of the season left after a shock 1–0 win over champions Manchester United at Old Trafford as well as Manchester City losing their penultimate game of the season at Ipswich Town. The attention was then quickly focused on improving the squad for 2001–02 in a bid to prevent another relegation battle.

Final league table

Results summary

Results by round

Results
Derby County's score comes first

Legend

FA Premier League

FA Cup

League Cup

Players

First-team squad
Squad at end of season

Left the club during season

Reserve squad

Transfers

In

Out

Transfers in:  £4,150,000
Transfers out:  £3,650,000
Total spending:  £500,000

Loan in
  Lilian Martin –  Marseille, 1 November
  Taribo West –  A.C. Milan, 2 November, three-month loan (later extended by a further five months on 24 January)
  Þórður Guðjónsson –  Las Palmas, 1 March, three-month loan

Statistics

Starting 11
Considering starts in all competitions
 GK: #1,  Mart Poom, 38
 RB: #5,  Rory Delap, 35
 CB: #2,  Horacio Carbonari, 31
 CB: #21,  Chris Riggott, 34
 LB: #15,  Danny Higginbotham, 28
 RM: #6,  Craig Burley, 28
 CM: #4,  Darryl Powell, 30
 CM: #7,  Seth Johnson, 34
 LM: #20,  Stefano Eranio, 29
 CF: #12,  Malcolm Christie, 36
 CF: #9,  Deon Burton, 29

Notes

References

Derby County F.C. seasons
Derby County